The Museum of Anthropology of National Taiwan University (NTU) is a museum at the NTU main campus in Da'an District, Taipei, Taiwan.

History
The museum was opened in November 2010.

Exhibitions
Artifacts of the museum came from Taihoku Imperial University during the Japanese rule. After the establishment of NTU, the artifacts became the collection of NTU Department of Anthropology.

Transportation
The museum is accessible within walking distance northeast from Gongguan Station of the Taipei Metro.

See also
 List of museums in Taiwan
 National Taiwan University

References

2010 establishments in Taiwan
Anthropology museums
Museums established in 2010
Museums in Taipei
National Taiwan University
Science museums in Taiwan
University museums in Taiwan